Media Five Entertainment is a Pennsylvania based artist management and booking agency founded in 1970. The company has assisted in the careers of musicians and performers in the music industry. In addition to scores of regional and national headliners, the agency exclusively managed the American rock bands Live and Fuel in the 1990s which earned them international success.

History
Media Five Entertainment was founded in 1970 by David A Sestak, a musician, and artist from Easton, Pennsylvania. The agency specialized in booking regional bands and bringing national acts such as Aerosmith, Billy Joel, and Kiss to eastern Pennsylvania under the name Extensions of Man Concerts. In the 1980s, as the company had established itself as a booking agency, Media Five further expanded to create an artist management division, striving to nurture local bands from the ground up and guide them through recording, album releases, radio promotion, marketing campaigns, and touring. These artists have sold a combined 20 million records worldwide.

Billy Joel 
Media Five played a role in the career of Billy Joel. In particular, all but one performance by Joel in the Lehigh Valley area was put together by David Sestak himself. His efforts created a bond between Joel and local residents that continues to this day. Joel's familiarity with the area undoubtedly inspired the naming of one of his best-known songs, "Allentown," which was released in 1982. In December 1982, continued interest of Joel's music in the Allentown-Bethlehem area led Sestak to persuade local music director Bruce Bond to start a petition drive. The petition asked Joel to play in Allentown and was eventually signed by more than 10,000 people.

When Joel's fall tour was announced there was no Allentown date, however Sestak had been collecting news clippings and sending them to Joel's publicist, Elaine Shock, who apparently passed them on to Joel.  Joel personally phoned radio station 95.1 WZZO FM to discuss, and on December 27, 1982, Joel performed for 6,300 people at Lehigh University's Stabler Arena. "Everyone was there," said Sestak. "Billy Joel finally played 'Allentown', in Bethlehem."

Worldwide success 
Sestak gets credit for bringing Live, once just a local band named Public Affection from York, Pennsylvania, to super-stardom in the mid 1990s with their breakout second album, Throwing Copper, fueled by the #1 hit single, "Lightning Crashes". Sestak was the band's manager until mid 2000, and is thanked first in the liner notes of Live's first four major label albums: Mental Jewelry, Throwing Copper, Secret Samadhi, and The Distance To Here. In 1998, Sestak also played a vital role as co-manager in the success of Fuel, another Pennsylvania band with two platinum albums to their credit, including 2000's Something Like Human. That album yielded the #1 modern rock hit "Hemorrhage (In My Hands)". The song was recently named Billboard's #1 5 rock song of the 2000s. Media Five has also represented and managed notable bands like Breaking Benjamin, Weston, July For Kings, Solution A.D., and Joe Hedges.

Current operations 
Media Five Entertainment represents and books nearly 25 original and cover bands in the eastern United States. Sestak also chaired the "Managers, Agents and Promoters" panel in February 2008 at Pennsylvania's annual Millennium Music Conference.

References

External links
 
 http://www.tfaoi.com/aa/6aa/6aa192.htm
 https://query.nytimes.com/gst/fullpage.html?res=9C0DE5D61531F936A15756C0A9659C8B63&sec=&spon=&pagewanted=all
 http://www.popmatters.com/pm/news/article/51445/royal-treatment-bonded-billy-joel-to-allentown/
 https://web.archive.org/web/20080222171125/http://www6.islandrecords.com/site/artist_home.php?artist_id=640
 https://web.archive.org/web/20080517035440/http://musicconference.net/mmc12/

Companies based in Pennsylvania
American companies established in 1970
1970 establishments in Pennsylvania